Nestande is a surname. Notable people with the surname include:

Brian Nestande (born 1964), American politician
Bruce Nestande (1938–2020), American politician, father of Brian